Le Congo illustré (French; "The Congo Illustrated") was a fortnightly illustrated periodical, published in Brussels by Alphonse-Jules Wauters from December 1891 to December 1895. The magazine was dedicated to Belgian exploration and economic development in the Congo Free State with a focus on geography, ethnography and civil engineering. In 1896 Le Congo illustré was folded into Le Mouvement Géographique, a journal also edited by Wauters.

See also
 List of magazines in Belgium

References

External links

http://library.si.edu/digital-library/book/lecongoillustr11892brux Vol. 1 (1892)
http://gallica.bnf.fr/ark:/12148/bpt6k1058726 Vol. 3 (1894), nos. 1-26.

Biweekly magazines
Congo Free State
Defunct magazines published in Belgium
French-language magazines
Geographic magazines
Magazines established in 1891
Magazines disestablished in 1895
Magazines published in Brussels
Photojournalistic magazines